NGC 264 is a lenticular galaxy located in the constellation Sculptor. It was discovered on August 30, 1834 by John Herschel.

References

External links
 

0264
Lenticular galaxies
Sculptor (constellation)
002831